Gambatesa is a comune (municipality) in the Province of Campobasso in the Italian region Molise, located about  southeast of Campobasso.

Gambatesa borders the following municipalities: Celenza Valfortore, Macchia Valfortore, Pietracatella, Riccia, Tufara.

References

Cities and towns in Molise